Hubbardia is a genus in the grass family that is endemic to India. It is the only genus in the tribe Hubbardieae of the subfamily Micrairoideae.

Species
Species include:
 Hubbardia diandra Chandore, Gosavi & S.R.Yadav — native to the Western Ghats, in Maharashtra and Karnataka states.
 Hubbardia heptaneuron Bor — native to Karnataka state.

References

Micrairoideae
Endemic flora of India (region)
Grasses of India
Flora of Karnataka
Flora of Maharashtra
Flora of the Western Ghats
Poaceae genera